Tambacounda (Wolof: Tambaakundaa ) is the largest city in eastern Senegal,  southeast of Dakar, and is the regional capital of the province of the same name. Its estimated population in 2007 was 78,800.

Geography
Tambacounda is situated on the sparsely populated sahélien plains of eastern Senegal.

Nearby towns include Madina Maboule, Koukari, Yoro Sankoule, Sambadian, Djidje Kounda, Afia Seno, Saare Boylii and Kanderi Niana.

Climate
Tambacounda has a tropical savanna climate (Köppen Aw), bordering upon a hot semi-arid climate (BSh). Like most of West Africa, the area has two seasons, the rainy season from June to October, characterized by heat, humidity and storms, and the sweltering, rainless dry season from November to May.

Population and culture

Between the censuses of 1988 and 2002, Tambacounda grew from 41,885 to 67,543 inhabitants.

In 2007, according to official estimates, the population reached 78,800 persons.

Settled first by Mandike peoples on the outskirts of the Mali Empire, on the regular transhumance routes of Fula cattle herders, and settled again by Wolof farmers in the early 20th century, Tambacounda has a mix of most of the ethnic groups in Senegal.

The Tambacounda region is famous for its rich djembe and dance culture and heritage. Some of the greatest djembe masters from Segu, Mali came to Tambacounda in the mid 1900s, bringing with them their history, knowledge, and secrets of the djembe. Among the famous musicians from Tambacounda was drummer Abdoulaye Diakité.

Religion
As with most of Senegal, the population is overwhelmingly Muslim, with much of the Wolof population in the region tracing their roots to Mouride sufi adherents who were given wild grassland by the brotherhood to clear and settle at the beginning of the 20th century.  There is a Roman Catholic Diocese of Tambacounda, but only 1.8% of the population of the region is Roman Catholic.

Transport hub

Historically, the city grew from a village along the Dakar–Bamako railway, built in the colonial period, and still used today, however passenger travel itself is limited. A branch line junctioning from this station is proposed to serve Kédougou.

The city lies on the N1 and N7 roads. As a part of the Trans-Sahelian Highway system, these are critical for traffic going between the Kayes Region of Mali and the coastal regions of Sénégal (Dakar, Thiès, Saint-Louis), the most densely populated parts of both these nations. This east–west travel intersects with Senegal's most important route from Dakar to the Casamance region, which is cut off by Gambia.  Slow river ferries, border posts, and corrupt border guards mean that many Senegalese are willing to travel far out of their way to avoid the international border.  In 2002 the MV Joola ferry from Dakar to Ziguinchor sank, but since then a new ferry has replaced it and the water route to Ziguinchor has reopened.  The road through Tambacounda is the only internal route between the two parts of the country, however it is also possible to travel through the Gambia.

The town also has an airport, Tambacounda Airport, serviced by national and international flights.

Agriculture
Tambacounda is also a center for agricultural processing, with millet, sorgum, maize and cotton grown in the dry plains of the region. Sodefitex operates a large cotton processing plant in the town.

History

Tambacounda was a Mandinka town and trade center at the beginning of French colonization.  With the railway came more intensive cultivation of grains and cotton by Wolof peoples seeking arable land.  French colonial authorities made the town a major transport hub, and a number of buildings, including the rail station retain the colonial flavor.

Administration
Tambacounda is the capital of Tambacounda Department (which includes three administrative regions) and the large Tambacounda Region.

Souty Touré, the current mayor, was formerly a government minister under Abdou Diouf, and was the founder of the Parti socialiste authentique (PSA) political party.  The PSA has only one seat in the legislature, and Tambacounda is its political base.

Sites of interest

The Niokolo-Koba National Park lies just to the south of the town, and is famed for its wildlife.

In 2003, the iron-framed rail station, the Hôtel de la Gare, and the colonial Préfecture building were placed on Senegal's list of Monuments historiques.

Sister cities
  Bondy in France.
  La Roche sur Yon in France (local development project)
  Sint-Niklaas in Belgium since 2003

See also 
 Transport in Senegal

References 
 Translation of :fr:Tambacounda (January 2008).

External links
  Site officiel de la commune
  Tambacounda sur Planète Sénégal
  tambacounda.info: Tambacounda based news and web portal.
 Peace Corps Senegal, Tambacounda Page

Bibliography
 Sekna Cissé, Évolution de la population de Tambacounda 1915-1976. Essai d’interprétation, Université de Dakar, 1981, 85 p. (Mémoire de Maîtrise de géographie)
 Mamadou Issa Diallo, Étude du vent d’une station synoptique, Tambacounda (1946-1975), Université de Dakar : 1983, 141 p. (Mémoire de Maîtrise de géographie)
 Astou Diène, L’évolution économique du cercle de Tambacounda de 1919 à 1946, Université de Dakar : 1986, 99 p. (Mémoire de Maîtrise)
 Pascal Handschuhmacher, « Tambacounda, une ville historique sans histoire ? » in Jean-Luc Piermay et Cheikh Sarr (dir.), La ville sénégalaise. Une invention aux frontières du monde, Paris, Karthala, 2007, p. 200-203  
 Abou Ndour, Monographie de la ville de Tambacounda des origines à l’indépendance (1960), Dakar, Université Cheikh Anta Diop, 1993, 63 p. (Mémoire de Maîtrise)

 
Tambacounda Region
Regional capitals in Senegal
Populated places in Tambacounda Region
Communes of Senegal